Sophisticated Boom Box MMXVI is a comprehensive box set by English band Dead or Alive, released on both 17CD/2DVD and 10LP versions, on October 28, 2016.

The set compiles the band's seven studio albums, from Sophisticated Boom Boom (1984) to Fragile (2000), and includes the remix albums Rip It Up (1987), Nude: Remade Remodelled (1989) and Unbreakable: The Fragile Remixes (2001).

Variants of both the CD/DVD and LP sets were sold on Amazon with limited edition exclusivities. The CD/DVD edition came with a signed print by band frontman Pete Burns, limited to 750 units, and the LP version came with a bonus 10" vinyl EP including tracks previously unreleased on the format.

Along with the previously released material compiled, the CD/DVD set is noteworthy for the inclusion of 12 previously unreleased tracks in the Dead or Alive discography, including, but not limited to, "Fan The Flame" featuring German singer Gina X, "The Art", a Pete Burns solo track produced by The Dirty Disco, and a full concert recording from the Youthquake Tour, recorded live at the Hammersmith Odeon in July 1985.

With the release of the Sophisticated Boom Box, Nude: Remade Remodelled (1989), Fan The Flame (Part 1) (1990), Nukleopatra (1995), Fragile (2000) and Unbreakable: The Fragile Remixes (2001) were given their debut UK releases, with all but Nukleopatra previously only being available in Japan. The vinyl set marked the first time that the post-Nude (1988) albums were released on the format, in any territory.

The collection was the last Dead or Alive release Burns contributed to before his death in October 2016, 5 days before the set's release. This would also be the final release drummer/producer Steve Coy would contribute to before his death in May 2018.

Background
Prior to the Sophisticated Boom Box, Dead or Alive had released three greatest hits collections, Rip It Up (1987), Evolution: The Hits (2003) and That's The Way I Like It: The Best of Dead or Alive (2010), all on Epic/Sony Records. All three were composed of the band's UK singles, with only Evolution including the band's '90s and 2000s output.

Unlike the aforementioned compilations, Sophisticated Boom Box MMXVI was the first collection to comprehensively compile the Dead or Alive discography, including Pete Burns' solo material, however, excluding all material from earlier than Sophisticated Boom Boom (1984), the pre-Epic period. The set includes the UK number one "You Spin Me Round (Like A Record)", US dance number ones "Brand New Lover" and "Come Home (With Me Baby)" and Japanese number one "Turn Around And Count 2 Ten", where the latter remained atop the chart for 17 weeks.

Fan The Flame (Part 1) (1990), Nukleopatra (1995) and Fragile (2000) were given new cover art and updates to their respective track lists for their debut UK releases as a part of the set.

The collection would be succeeded by Invincible, a box set solely compiling the band's '90s and 2000s material, in 2020.

Promotion
The release of Sophisticated Boom Box MMXVI was announced on September 8, 2016 via Demon Music Group as a "personally curated [by Burns and Coy] 19 disc set, featuring the original album tracklistings plus a plethora of rarities, live recordings, alternate mixes, instrumental versions and more than 12 previously unreleased remixes and tracks from their vaults, bringing a unique collection together from the band’s internationally successful career for the very first time."

A promo video for the set was released shortly after on the band's Facebook group on Amazon and YouTube, featuring the music videos for the singles, "You Spin Me Round", "Lover Come Back To Me", "Brand New Lover", "In Too Deep", "Something In My House", "That's The Way (I Like It)" and the 2003 version of "You Spin Me Round" from Evolution: The Hits.

Burns was due to appear on the British talk show Loose Women to promote the set on October 24, 2016, the day after he died, but pulled out the week prior due to "ill health".

Errors 
On the day of release, Demon Music Group released a statement on their website detailing multiple errors with the CD/DVD variant of the box set, and offering replacements for nine of the 17 CDs and both DVDs. Another statement on November 28, 2016, detailed further issues regarding the mispressing of most of the set's discs.

 On CD1, ""I'd Do Anything" finishes with an extra “do do do” which sounds odd on play back." Tracks 8 and 9 are "cut short in the blending of these two tracks." ""That's The Way (I Like It) (7" Version)" plays at a slower speed."
 On CD2, ""What I Want (1984 Dance Mix)" plays the same as track 2, the "Original Dance Mix"." Tracks 1-4 were "ripped directly from the Cherry Pop release, sourced from vinyl." Track 9 is "identical to" track 12. 
 CD3 "plays in mono." ""My Heart Goes Bang (7" Version)" plays the same as the album version." ""Lover Come Back To Me" plays at a "slower speed."
 CD4 "plays in mono." ""My Heart Goes Bang (American WIPE-OUT Mix)" should be listed as an edit." ""You Spin Me Round (Big Ben Mix)" sounds like a reconstruction."
 On CD6, "there is an awkward gap between "Then There Was You" and "Come Inside"." ""Brand New Lover (Edit)" appears to be slower than any other version. ""I Want You (7" Mix)" is sourced from vinyl." 
 On CD8, ""Something In My House (Short Version)" plays the 7" remix." ""Baby Don't Say Goodbye (The Powerful Club Twelve)" is sourced from vinyl."
 On CD9, tracks 1 and 2 are "easily identified as coming from a vinyl source, and sourced from low bitrate MP3s". ""You Spin Me Round (Like A Record) (Blue Sky Mix)" is ripped from vinyl, skips three seconds into the track and is sourced from a low bitrate MP3." (The exact source for this track was ripped from YouTube).
 On CD11, ""Baby Don't Say Goodbye (Extended Mix)" has bad sound quality."
 On CD14, "tracks 1 and 6 are identical up until 6:10-ish..." ""International Thing (Nu-NRG 12" Remix)" plays the album version."
 Both DVDs had "freezing and cropping issues".

On December 8, 2016, Demon released a third statement regarding mispressed vinyl Sophisticated Boom Box sets, with the Nude LP pressed to play Elvis Presley & The Royal Philharmonic Orchestra's The Wonder of You. Re-pressed correct copies were sent to customers shortly after.

Track listing
The CD/DVD package contains the full, 272-track compilation, including remixes, alternate versions, live performances and previously unreleased tracks. The abridged LP package only contains the band's seven studio albums, and excludes all bonus material.

The track list below represent the corrected, non-mispressed versions of the CD/DVD version of the set.

Tracks 11-15 are denoted as bonus tracks.

All tracks are denoted as bonus tracks.
Tracks 9 and 10 are denoted as being previously unreleased.

Tracks 10-14 are denoted as bonus tracks.

All tracks are denoted as bonus tracks.
Tracks 10 and 11 are denoted as being previously unreleased.

All tracks are denoted as bonus tracks.
All tracks, except 1, 3 and 4, are denoted as being previously unreleased.

Tracks 10-17 are denoted as bonus tracks.

All tracks are denoted as bonus tracks.
Tracks 6 and 12 are denoted as being previously unreleased.

Tracks 9-13 are denoted as bonus tracks.
Track 13 is denoted as being previously unreleased.

All tracks are denoted as bonus tracks.

Tracks 10-18 are denoted as bonus tracks. Track 16 is denoted as being previously unreleased.

Tracks 8-13 are denoted as bonus tracks. Track 13 is denoted as being previously unreleased.

Tracks 10-12 are denoted as bonus tracks. Track 1 is denoted as being previously unreleased.

Track 12 is denoted as a bonus track.

All tracks are denoted as bonus tracks.

All tracks denoted as bonus tracks. Track 11 denoted as being previously unreleased.

References

Dead or Alive (band) compilation albums
2016 greatest hits albums